Vinaigrette is a salad dressing or sauce.

Vinaigrette or vinegarette may also refer to:

 Vinegret or Russian Vinaigrette, a salad in Russian cuisine
 Vinagrete, a Brazilian condiment 
 Vinaigrette box, a small container with a perforated top, containing a strongly scented substance such as vinegar or smelling salts
 Vinaigrette, a type of rickshaw formerly used in French cities.